Euphrytus parvicollis is a species of leaf beetle. It is found in Mexico and Arizona.

References

Further reading

 

Eumolpinae
Articles created by Qbugbot
Beetles described in 1933
Beetles of North America
Taxa named by Charles Frederic August Schaeffer